Alessandro Savelli (28 May 1905 – 21 November 1930) was an Italian professional footballer who played as a midfielder.

External links 
Profile at magliarossonera.it 
Profile at enciclopediadelcalcio.com 

1905 births
1930 deaths
Italian footballers
Association football midfielders
Parma Calcio 1913 players
A.C. Milan players
Inter Milan players
U.S. Cremonese players
Association football forwards